The Saint and Her Fool (German: Die Heilige und ihr Narr) is a 1957 Austrian drama film directed by Gustav Ucicky and starring Gerhard Riedmann, Gudula Blau and Hertha Feiler.

It was based on the novel of the same title by Agnes Günther. Two previous film versions had been made a silent film in 1928 and a sound film in 1935.

The film's sets were designed by the art directors Isabella Schlichting and Werner Schlichting. It was shot using Agfacolor. It was made with backing from the West German distributor Gloria Film.

Cast
Gerhard Riedmann as Harro  
Gudula Blau as Rosmarie  
Hertha Feiler as Charlotte  
Willy Birgel as Prince von Brauneck  
Heinrich Gretler as Professor Guter  
Franca Parisi as Angelina  
Alma Seidler as Lisa  
Hugo Gottschlich as Caliban  
Karl Skraup as Sanitätsrat  
Elisabeth Epp as Frau Sprüngli  
Auguste Ripper as Giulietta  
Ruth Scheerbarth as Frl. Braun  
Brigitte Stanzel as little Rosmarie 
Karl Hruschka as postman

References

External links

Austrian drama films
1957 drama films
Films directed by Gustav Ucicky
Films based on German novels
Remakes of German films
Gloria Film films
Sascha-Film films
1950s German-language films